Jan Bratkowski (born 25 July 1975) is a German former professional racing cyclist. He notably won the Raiffeisen Grand Prix in 2001 and the Grand Prix Pino Cerami in 2000.

Major results

1999
 2nd Overall GP Kranj
1st Stage 2
 2nd Raiffeisen Grand Prix
 9th Overall UNIQA Classic
1st Stage 2
2000
 1st Grand Prix Pino Cerami
 1st Stage 12 Tour de Langkawi
 2nd Route Adélie
 4th First Union Invitational
 4th GP de la Ville de Rennes
 5th Road race, National Road Championships
 7th Omloop van het Houtland
 7th Tour Beneden-Maas
2001
 1st Raiffeisen Grand Prix
 1st Poreč Trophy 4
 2nd Poreč Trophy 3
 7th Stausee-Rundfahrt
 8th Giro della Provincia di Siracusa
2002
 3rd Trofeo dell'Etna
2005
 2nd 
 10th GP Rudy Dhaenens

References

External links

1975 births
Living people
German male cyclists
Sportspeople from Würzburg
Cyclists from Bavaria